Irene Lange Nordahl (born 11 February 1968 in Sørreisa) is a Norwegian politician representing the Centre Party. In the 2009 election, she was elected to parliament from Troms, and serves on the Standing Committee on Business and Industry, and is the Center Party's spokesperson on commerce issues.

Prior to her election to parliament, Nordahl served in the county council for Troms, and was the county councilor on commerce between 2005 and 2007. She has ten years of experience in the municipality council and chairmanship in Sørreisa.

In the 2009 election campaign, Nordahl was nominated as her party's top candidate. She campaigned on expanding the travel industry in northern Norway, this involved improving the road network, and supporting a railway line through Troms. Her campaign was energetic and highly visible. In the end she succeeded in winning Troms' leveling seat, narrowly ahead of Lena Jensen of the Socialist Left.

External links
 Nordahl, Irene Lange (1968-  ) Entry on parliamentary website.

References

1968 births
Living people
People from Sørreisa
Centre Party (Norway) politicians
Members of the Storting
21st-century Norwegian politicians